James B. Baker (July 12, 1941 – February 4, 2014), sometimes credited as Jim B. Baker, was an American stage, film and television actor. He was best known for his stage work in regional repertory theatre and for his role as tightwad banker Farley Waters on the short-lived 1980–81 CBS sitcom Flo, a spin-off of Alice.

Life and career
Baker was born on July 12, 1941, in Great Falls, Montana, the only child of Lloyd and Ferne Baker, who ran a real estate and insurance business in Conrad where he was raised. His first foray into acting came as a student while attending the University of Montana where he spent his summers performing at the Oregon Shakespeare Festival and the Bigfork Playhouse. After a tour of duty with the United States Army during the Vietnam War, Baker plunged himself into acting. By 1971, he had earned a spot with the Milwaukee Repertory Theater in Wisconsin.

Following his debut as a soccer coach in the low-budget comedy film Manny's Orphans, Baker and his wife Mary moved to Los Angeles in 1979 where he was soon cast as the greedy and obnoxious banker Farley Waters opposite Polly Holliday on the short-lived CBS sitcom Flo (1980–81), a spin-off of Alice. After Flo was cancelled, he made several guest appearances on television shows such as The Dukes of Hazzard, Silver Spoons and Simon & Simon. By 1986, Baker had left Hollywood behind him and joined the Denver Centre Theatre Company in Denver, Colorado, where he remained for the next eight years, performing in productions of Cat on a Hot Tin Roof, A Christmas Carol as well as dramatic roles in the Arthur Miller plays Death of a Salesman, The Price and All My Sons.

Baker was also a member of the resident acting companies at San Francisco's American Conservatory Theater, Actors Theatre of Louisville and the Guthrie Theater in Minneapolis. In 1995, Baker returned to the Milwaukee Repertory Theater where he began his career 24 years before and continued to work there until 2006, when he injured his back while rehearsing for the lead role in a production of King Lear. In 2007, he and his wife Mary retired to their home in Conrad, Montana.

Death
Baker, who suffered from lung and heart disease, died on February 4, 2014, after collapsing at a Montana hotel where he and his wife were staying. He was 72.

Filmography

References

External links

1941 births
2014 deaths
American male stage actors
American male television actors
American male film actors
Male actors from Montana
People from Great Falls, Montana
People from Conrad, Montana
20th-century American male actors
21st-century American male actors